Sean Donohue is an American horror movie director, actor, and producer.

Filmography

References

External links
 

American directors
American producers
American male actors
Living people
Year of birth missing (living people)